The  (stylised as ist) is a subcompact car manufactured by the Japanese automaker Toyota. It is exported to the United States as the Scion xA and Scion xD, the Middle East as the Toyota xA and to Europe and Latin America as the Toyota Urban Cruiser for the second generation.

The Ist, the sixth brand to use the Vitz as the base model, was conceived as a high-end multi-use compact car with SUV-like styling and wagon-like roominess. The car was fitted with either a 1.3-liter (FWD) or a 1.5-liter engine (FWD or 4WD), with a Super ECT transmission. A wide front grille consisting of two thick horizontal bars, large 15-inch tires, and extended wheel arches gave the vehicle its unique and dynamic exterior styling. The body dimensions were a notch above those of the Vitz, giving more space to the cabin and the trunk. The 6:4 split rear seats could be fully folded to widen the deck as necessary. The sturdy body structure was realized through the advanced GOA (Global Outstanding Assessment) process, which enhanced safety in collisions with heavier vehicles.

In Japan, it was available at Toyota dealerships Netz Store (first and second generation models) and Toyopet Store (pre-facelift first generation model only).

The car's name is derived from the suffix "-ist," the name points to a person who is passionate about something (stylist, artist, specialist, and so on).



First generation (XP60; 2002)

Based on the first generation Toyota Vitz hatchback, the first generation Ist also shared a platform with the Platz sedan.

The model codes are NCP60 (1300, 2NZ, FWD), NCP61 (1500, 1NZ, FWD), NCP65 (1500, 1NZ, 4WD).

The Ist was developed from the Vitz supermini in a crossover SUV bodystyle offering the flexibility of larger SUVs, but with the advantage of better fuel economy from a smaller vehicle. It first appeared at the 2001 Tokyo Motor Show, and went on sale on 8 May 2002 at Netz Store (all prefectures), Toyopet Store (excluding Osaka prefecture) and Toyota Store (Osaka prefecture only). It received its facelift on 30 May 2005 and was only available at Netz Store.

The Ist is meant to cater to younger drivers, being sold as a Scion in North America and as the xA in the Middle East. The Ist interior features a unique interior with an easy to read central instrumental cluster position similar to the Vitz, Platz and Vios. At its introduction, 42,000 orders were received in Japan.

Its primary competitor is the Honda Fit and the Nissan March. The first-generation car was used by the Shizuoka Prefectural Police as a police car.

Second generation (XP110; 2007) 

The second generation Ist is similar to the five-door Toyota Yaris/Vitz; however, unlike the Vitz, the instrument  gauges are now shifted in front of the driver as opposed to the middle of the dashboard previously.

This new Ist, like its predecessor, is sold as a Scion in the US. But instead of being the new xA, it is called the xD. The only real difference between the Ist and xD is a revised front fascia.

In Europe and Latin America, it is sold as the Urban Cruiser with slightly different front panels.

In Japan, the second generation Ist went on sale on 30 July 2007 was only available at Netz Store. It is sold in two grades namely 150G and 150X and equipped with Super CVT-i for the 1NZ-FE option. One appealing offer for the 1NZ equipped model is the choice of AWD, which was not carried over to the US for the xD. Furthermore, a center console is offered on Japan's Ist, but not the US' xD. The 180G with the 2ZR-FE engine option was also offered until August 2010.

Starting with production model year 2007 in Japan, G-BOOK, a subscription telematics service, is offered as an option.

The former Kanto Auto Works produced the Ist from January 2010.

Production of the Ist ended in March 2016. Sales of the Ist were discontinued in Japan on 29 April 2016. It was replaced by the Yaris Cross in 2020.

Urban Cruiser 

The Urban Cruiser is a version of the second generation Ist that was sold in Europe. It was first introduced in 2008. It is slotted below the RAV4 to compete against small crossover SUVs like the Nissan Qashqai and Kia Soul, while also attracting buyers of mainstream family hatchbacks. Designed by Toyota ED², it debuted at the March 2008 Geneva Motor Show and went on sale shortly thereafter.

The Urban Cruiser did not have sales success in Europe after 2011 due to the ongoing strength of the Japanese yen, and production was discontinued in 2014. It was replaced by the Yaris Cross in 2021.

The "Urban Cruiser" nameplate has been reused twice: between 2020 and 2022 for the rebadged Suzuki Vitara Brezza, and then since 2022 for the rebadged Grand Vitara as the "Urban Cruiser Hyryder".

Mechanicals and emissions 
Front-wheel drive is standard, but the diesel model is also offered with an all-wheel drive option. Both come with a 6-speed manual transmission. There is no automatic option.

Safety 
Despite being equipped with seven airbags, anti-lock brakes and traction control, the car received a relatively poor Euro NCAP safety rating of 3/5 stars.

References 

Ist
Cars introduced in 2002
2010s cars
Subcompact cars
Front-wheel-drive vehicles
All-wheel-drive vehicles
Hatchbacks
Mini sport utility vehicles
Crossover sport utility vehicles
Vehicles with CVT transmission
Euro NCAP superminis